David Gall may refer to:

 David A. Gall (1941–2021), American jockey
 David Gall (printer) (1825–1887) South Australian printer and activist